Vigilance is the second official full-length studio album by the Canadian melodic death metal band Threat Signal, released three years after their first album Under Reprisal. It was produced by Jon Howard. The album shifted some 1,100 copies in its first week of sale in the US.

Track listing

Credits
 Jon Howard - Vocals
 Travis Montgomery - Lead guitar
 Adam Weber - Rhythm guitar
 Pat Kavanagh - Bass guitar
 Norman Killeen - Drums

Personnel
 Produced by Jon Howard
 Co-produced by Threat Signal
 Mixing and mastering by Greg Reely 
 Keyboards and additional guitar by Jon Howard
 Art Direction by Jon Howard & Norman Killeen
 Artwork by Norman Killeen for NME studios

References

External links
Lambgoat review

2009 albums
Threat Signal albums
Nuclear Blast albums